Drew Saunders (by 1525 – 1579), of Hillingdon, Middlesex, was an English Member of Parliament.

He represented Brackley in 1558.

References

1579 deaths
English MPs 1558
People from Hillingdon
Year of birth uncertain